This is a list of places, buildings, roads and other things named for the medieval Georgian poet Shota Rustaveli.

Geographic locations  
 Rustaveli Avenue, one of the central thoroughfares in Tbilisi, Georgia
 Shota Rustaveli Street, Kyiv, street in Kyiv
 Shota Rustaveli Street, Tashkent, street in Tashkent
 Shota Rustaveli Peak, a mountain in the central part of the Greater Caucasus

Organizations 
 Shota Rustaveli National Science Foundation, a Georgian government agency supporting fundamental research and education
 Shota Rustaveli Society, a civil organization established in Georgia in 1988

Structures 
 Rustaveli Cinema, a movie theatre in Tbilisi, Georgia
 Shota Rustaveli State Academic Theatre, a theatre in Tbilisi, Georgia
 Shota Rustaveli Institute of Georgian Literature, a research institute in Tbilisi, Georgia
 Shota Rustaveli Theatre and Film University, an educational institution in Tbilisi, Georgia
 Shota Rustaveli State University, an educational institution in Batumi, Georgia
 Shota Rustaveli Tbilisi International Airport, Georgia's main international airport
 Rustaveli, a metro station of Tbilisi Metro

Ships 
 , a former Soviet cargo ship
 , a former Soviet cruise ship

Other 
 Shota Rustaveli Prize, a prize awarded by the Georgian government in the fields of art and science
 Rustaveli, a basin located in the northern hemisphere of Mercury

References 

Shota Rustaveli